Eureko was a large European insurance company based in the Netherlands. The company was formed in 1992 and has operations in the Netherlands, Ireland, Greece, Turkey, Slovakia, Russia, Romania and Bulgaria. The company grew significantly in 2005 when Rabobank merged its insurance company, Interpolis, into Eureko in exchange for a 37% share in the company. In 2011 Eureko merged with the Dutch parent company Achmea N.V. to form Achmea B.V.

References

Financial services companies established in 1992
Insurance companies of the Netherlands
Multinational companies headquartered in the Netherlands
Privately held companies of the Netherlands
Companies based in Utrecht (province)
Zeist